Nagalapuram is a Mandal Headquarter in Tirupati district of the Indian state of Andhra Pradesh. It is the mandal headquarters of Nagalapuram mandal in Srikalahasti revenue division. This town is home to Vedanarayana Temple, where the presiding deity Vishnu is in the form of Matsya, the first incarnation of Dasavatara.

History 
Nagalapuram the temple town is built at the time of Krishnadevaraya of Vijayanagara Empire regime in memory of his mother Nagamamba Devi. Hence, it became Sri Nagalapuram. Before the change of its name to Nagalapuram, this village was known as Harigandapuram.

Geography 

It has an average elevation of 64 meters (213 feet).

Culture 

Temple reflects the Vijayanagara  architectural style Vedanarayana swamy idol facing west. The sanctum sanctorum has Vedanarayana swamy with his consorts Sridevi and Bhoodevi on either side. This is a Matsya Avatar of Lord Vishnu first Avatar, who saved the four vedas from Somakudu and returned to Brahma. Temple Brahmostavam comes on Shukla Dwadasi, Trayodasi and Chaturdasi of Phalguni masam (Agama calendar). Temple architecture is done in such a way that during these three days, the sun rays fall on the main deity feet, navel and forehead, called as "Suriya Pooja". This remarks the start of Summer season as per the holy inscriptions available in the temple.

Nagalapuram Falls 
Nagalapuram Falls is a waterfall which attracts many tourists. It offers a great trekking opportunity as you go into the forest in the Eastern Ghats. The trek is very scenic and one can see streams along the trek route. There are 3 waterfalls you come across and each of them has a pool next to it. The water is very clean and refreshing.

Trekkers can visit the trekking route which is about 4 km in length and has views of three waterfalls. Paid parking facilities are available at the beginning of the trek. Due to its proximity to Chennai, large number of people visit the waterfalls each year and this has started taking a toll on the environment around the trek which is now heavily littered with waste left by trekkers.

The third waterfall, which is last in the series, has a deep pool which should not be explored without adequate safety equipment such as life jackets and due to negligence this has resulted in several drownings at this pool.

Demographics 
Total Number of House Hold : 2830

Population	  Persons	Males	Females
Total	          11,166	5,468	5,698
In the age group  0–6 years	1,072	588	484
Scheduled Castes (SC) 	4,296	2,164	2,132
Scheduled Tribes (ST) 	228	118	110
Literates 	  7,216	        3,917	3,299

Gallery

References

External links

Nagalapuram falls

Villages in Tirupati district
Mandal headquarters in Tirupati district
Tirupati district
Hindu pilgrimage sites in India